Tenacibaculum aestuariivivum is a Gram-negative, aerobic, non-spore-forming and non-motile bacterium from the genus of Tenacibaculum which has been isolated from tidal flat sediments from Jindo in Korea.

References 

Flavobacteria
Bacteria described in 2017